The Spark Divine is a 1919 American silent drama film, starring Alice Joyce, that was directed by Tom Terriss and produced and distributed by Vitagraph Company of America. This is now considered to be a lost film.

Plot
As described in a film magazine, the Van Arsdale's come into sudden wealth and raise their naturally sweet and sentimental child Marcia (Joyce) into a beautiful and cultured woman who is cold and calculating and with a heart of ice. She becomes known in society as the girl who challenges any man to arouse sentiment in her. When bankruptcy threatens the family, they believe their only salvation is their daughter's marriage to a millionaire. Robert Jardine (Carleton) is the man they select. Robert believes he sees the woman beneath the shell of Marcia, and when she coldly tells him that she will marry him only for his wealth, he agrees on the condition that she "will a wife – and a mother." Marcia keeps her part of the marriage agreement, but apparently cares nothing for her own child. Gradually the spark of mother-love brightens, but she is ashamed of her show of sentiment. Then the child is kidnapped, and Marcia is fraught with the fears that only a mother can know, showing the real woman in her. Then her child is brought to her, and it turns out that the kidnapping was a "frame" on the part of her husband.

Cast
Alice Joyce – Marcia Van Arsdale
William Carleton, Jr. – Robert Jardine
Eulalie Jensen – Mrs. Van Arsdale
Frank Norcross – Mr. Van Arsdale
Mary Carr – Mrs. Jardine

References

External links

allmovie/synopsis

1919 films
American silent feature films
Lost American films
Vitagraph Studios films
American black-and-white films
1919 drama films
Silent American drama films
1919 lost films
Lost drama films
Films directed by Tom Terriss
1910s American films
1910s English-language films